The 2010 Race of Champions was the 23rd running of the event, and took place over 27–28 November 2010 at the Esprit Arena in Düsseldorf, Germany. It was the first time the event had been held in Germany since 1989, when it was held at the Nürburgring.

Team Germany won a fourth consecutive Nations Cup with Michael Schumacher and Sebastian Vettel defeating Team Britain's Andy Priaulx and Jason Plato 2–1 in the final. In the driver-by-driver Race of Champions itself, Portugal's Filipe Albuquerque defeated multiple World Rally Champion Sébastien Loeb 2–1 in the final.

Participants

Cars
 Audi R8 LMS
 KTM X-Bow
 Porsche 911 GT3 Cup
 Euro Racecar
 ROC 2-seater
 ROC Car
 RX Racing RX150
 Solution F Prototype
 Volkswagen Scirocco

ROC Nations Cup

Group stage

Group A

Group B

Knockout stage

Semifinals

Final

Race of Champions

Group stage

Group A

Group B

Group C

Group D

Knockout stage

Quarterfinals

Semifinals

Final

References

External links 
 Official site
 ROC 2010 Results

Race of Champions
Race of Champions
Race of Champions
2010s in Düsseldorf
International sports competitions hosted by Germany